Kaye Scott (born 2 June 1984) is an Australian boxer who is active as an elite amateur athlete.  She is currently ranked 3rd internationally in the women's light heavy division after winning silver at the Women's World Championships (19-27 May 2016) in Astana, Kazakhstan.  Kaye is Sydney born and based and has been competing for 7 years both in Australia and internationally.

Amateur career
Kaye Scott is coached by Jamie Pittman as part of Team Business on the Central Coast of NSW.

Kaye competed in the Women's Middle division at the 2014 Commonwealth Games but didn't achieve a medal, losing to Lauren Price of Wales in the quarter finals. However, she went on to compete at the Women's World Championships in 2016, competing as a Light Heavyweight and winning a Silver Medal, losing to Xiaoli Yang in the Finals.

In September 2017 Kaye won the NSW state title against Jessica Messina in the Welterweight division  giving her an opportunity to fight in the Welterweight division at the National Titles.  She qualified for the 2018 Gold Coast Commonwealth Games team  when she beat Jessica Messina.  She was awarded Highest Internationally Ranked Australian Elite Women's Boxer in 2017 for her achievements in the sport.

Kaye actively works to support Women's boxing in Australia and boxing in Australia in general.  After the ban was lifted on women's boxing in NSW, she took part in the first female bout in NSW, an exhibition fight with Ramona Stephenson in October 2009.  Kaye captained the 2014 Commonwealth Games boxing team (the first time female boxing was included in the Commonwealth Games), helping to mentor and support other Australian male and female boxers.

References

External links

1984 births
Living people
Australian women boxers
Boxers from Sydney
Boxers at the 2014 Commonwealth Games
Boxers at the 2018 Commonwealth Games
Commonwealth Games bronze medallists for Australia
Welterweight boxers
Middleweight boxers
Light-heavyweight boxers
Commonwealth Games medallists in boxing
Medallists at the 2018 Commonwealth Games